Alessandro Figà Talamanca (born in Rome, 25 May 1938) is an Italian mathematician who has been given several prestigious tasks, both in Italy and abroad. Several times, he took part in managing the Italian University system, and shared his opinions in newspapers, such as La Repubblica. He was a close friend of Carlo Pucci, a mathematician who spent most of his energy in improving the method of teaching maths in Italy, and the management of Italian Maths Departments. (Pucci was, especially, the re-founder of the Istituto Nazionale di Alta Matematica Francesco Severi.) From 1995 to 2003, Figà Talamanca, successor to Pucci, was President of the Istituto, and he continued what Pucci had set up. He was also Vice-President of the European Mathematical Society.

Moreover, he was a member of the Consiglio Universitario Nazionale and, from 1999 to 2004, of the Comitato nazionale per la valutazione del sistema universitario.

Career

Figà Talamanca did research, and got valuable results, in the field of harmonic analysis, on aleatory Fourier series and the diffusion process, mostly in Rome - at La Sapienza -, but also in the US, especially in the Sixties. During that period on a Fulbright scholarship, he joined research activities in California, UCLA, where he got his Ph.D, in 1964, and, in the same year, was Acting Assistant Professor, and met the well-famous French-American mathematician Serge Lang, and also in Boston, Moore Instructor at MIT from 1966 to 1968.

While teaching at MIT, he read Tom M. Apostol's Calculus, a two-volume book, and decided to bring it back to Italy - when he was to become Professor at the University of Genova - with him: he was the one who proposed an Italian edition of Apostol's work to a printer in Turin, and he himself overwatched the translation, in 1977.

He was lecturer at Berkeley, from 1968 to 1969, then at Yale, from 1969 to 1970, then Visiting Professor in Maryland, in Washington, Wales and Sydney.

He taught Calculus for 50 years, including both Italian and American universities. Mostly, he referred to La Sapienza: in 2007, he became General Director of the Maths' Department there, but he was to leave in 2009 because he was 71.

He is able to speak English, and Modern Greek.

He has always been up against Eugene Garfield's Impact factor system in Science. (See here: L'Impact Factor nella valutazione della ricerca e nello sviluppo dell’editoria scientifica.)

Selected publications
with John Price: 
with Claudio Nebbia: 

with Tim Steger:

References

External links
Pubblicazioni – Full list of publications (titles in English)

1938 births
Living people
20th-century Italian mathematicians
Massachusetts Institute of Technology School of Science faculty
Presidents of the Italian Mathematical Union